The Colt Advanced Piston Carbine or Colt APC is a lightweight modular 5.56mm caliber piston-operated, magazine fed carbine with a one-piece upper receiver which is capable of firing in automatic and semi-automatic modes. The design incorporates an articulating link piston that reduces the stresses in the piston stroke by allowing for deflection and thermal expansion.

Design
The weapon has a suppression-ready fluted barrel, which is lighter and cools better than previous M4 barrels.  It is claimed to have "markedly better" accuracy.  To improve reliability, Colt used an articulating link piston (ALP) which "reduces the inherent stress in the piston stroke by allowing for deflection and thermal expansion". In traditional gas piston operating systems, the force of the piston striking the bolt carrier can push the bolt carrier downwards and into the wall of the buffer tube, leading to accelerated wear and even chipped metal.  This is known as carrier tilt.  The ALP (articulating link piston) allows the operating rod to wiggle to correct for the downward pressure on the bolt and transfers the force straight backwards in line with the bore and buffer assembly, eliminating the carrier tilt.  This relieves stress on parts and helps to increase accuracy.

Users
: Malaysian Special Operations Force units, the UTK and the VAT69
: Singapore Police Force, Used by Police Coast Guard Special Task Squadron and Emergency Response Team.

References

External links
 Colt's Manufacturing Company Official

5.56 mm firearms
Assault rifles
Carbines
Colt rifles
Rifles of the United States
ArmaLite AR-10 derivatives